Aneumastus is a genus of diatom belonging to the family Mastogloiaceae.

Species:

Aneumastus aksaraiensis 
Aneumastus albanicus 
Aneumastus apiculatus

References

Bacillariophyceae
Diatom genera